A vesiculo-vacuolar organelle (VVO) is an organelle that contributes to endothelial cell permeability. VVOs are found in the endothelium of normal blood vessels and vessels associated with tumors or allergic inflammation.

VVOs actively transport fluid and macromolecules from the cytoplasm of endothelial cells into the blood vessel lumen, contributing to the increase in vascular permeability that occurs during the process of inflammation. This kind of transport is mediated by VEGF, one of the chemical mediators of inflammation.

References

Organelles
Angiology